John B. Kupfer (March 10, 1833 – September 9, 1897) was a German-American politician and businessman from Kenosha, Wisconsin who served as Mayor of Kenosha.

Business career
John Kupfer came from Bavaria. In 1859, Kupfer established a bakery that would become the Kupfer Cracker Company. He is noted as the inventor of the Kenosha Cracker.

Political career
As mayor, John oversaw the construction of Kenosha’s sewer system, grading of streets, and organizing of a formal police force. He also oversaw the construction of Kenosha's high school and fire house. In addition to serving as mayor, Kufper served a five-year term as county supervisor of Kenosha County, Wisconsin. Politically, he was a Democrat.

Personal life
John Kupfer's son, William Kupfer, married Philomena Pirsch, sister of fire apparatus inventor Peter Pirsch.

He died on September 8, 1897.

References

1833 births
1897 deaths
Bavarian emigrants to the United States
Wisconsin Democrats
Mayors of Kenosha, Wisconsin
County supervisors in Wisconsin
19th-century American politicians